George Morgan Thomson, Baron Thomson of Monifieth,  (16 January 1921 – 3 October 2008) was a British politician and journalist who served as a Labour MP. He was a member of Harold Wilson's cabinet, and later became a European Commissioner.

In the 1980s, he joined the Social Democratic Party. Following the SDP's merger with the Liberal Party, he became a Liberal Democrat and sat as a Liberal Democrat member of the House of Lords.

Early life
Thomson was educated at Grove Academy, Broughty Ferry, Dundee. At 16 he left school to become a local reporter with the Dundee newspaper, magazine and comic publishers DC Thomson. He became deputy editor of the firms' successful comic The Dandy and for a short time was its editor, despite being only 18 years old. He left the firm in 1940 to serve in the Royal Air Force. Due to eyesight problems he was not able to take a flight crew role and served on the ground for fighter command. He returned to DC Thomson in 1946, but left the firm after clashing with them over his right to join a trade union. He was then became assistant editor, and later editor, of Forward, a Scottish-based socialist newspaper, from 1946 to 1953.

Political career
At the 1950 and 1951 general elections, Thomson stood unsuccessfully in Glasgow Hillhead. In 1952, he was elected Member of Parliament in a by-election for Dundee East, where he served until his resignation in 1972. He served in the Wilson government as Minister of State, Foreign Office, from October 1964 to April 1966, then as Chancellor of the Duchy of Lancaster from 1966 to 1967, and again from 1969 to 1970, Secretary of State for Commonwealth Affairs from 1967 to 1968, and Minister without Portfolio from 1968 to 1969. During his time as Commonwealth Secretary he had responsibility for trying to reach a settlement of the Southern Rhodesia (now Zimbabwe) question and for implementing sanctions against the regime there. He was one of the first British Commissioners of the European Community (EC) from 1973 to 1977, with responsibility for regional policy. As chairman of the Independent Broadcasting Authority (IBA) from 1981 to 1988 he oversaw the introduction of Channel 4 and TV-am.

He was Chair of the Advertising Standards Authority from 1977 to 1980; Chair of the IBA 1981–88; a European Commissioner, with responsibility for Regional Policy 1973–76; First Crown Estate Commissioner from 1977 to 1980; and a Member of the Committee on Standards in Public Life from 1994 until 1997. He was Deputy Chair of the Woolwich Building Society from 1988 to 1991. He had been a Lords' Member of the Parliamentary Broadcasting Unit since 1993. He was a Fellow of the Royal Society of Edinburgh and the Royal Television Society, and a patron of Sustrans.

In 1985 he was invited to deliver the MacMillan Memorial Lecture to the Institution of Engineers and Shipbuilders in Scotland; he chose "Does Public Broadcasting Have a Future? The Challenge of the New Technologies". After moving with his wife, Grace, to Charing, Kent, Thomson held the position of Party President, for Ashford Liberal Democrats, from 1999 to 2006.

Death
He died on Friday 3 October 2008 at London's St Thomas' Hospital, from a viral infection. He was survived by his wife, Grace, Lady Thomson (1925–2014), and their two daughters, Ailsa and Caroline, the former chief operating officer of the BBC.

Honours
Thomson received an honorary doctorate from Heriot-Watt University in 1973.

Thomson was made a Privy Counsellor in 1966, was created a Life Peer on 23 March 1977 as Baron Thomson of Monifieth, of Monifieth in the District of the City of Dundee, and became a Knight of the Thistle in 1981.

References

External links 

 
 

|-

|-

|-

|-

|-

|-

|-

|-

|-

1921 births
2008 deaths
British European Commissioners
British Secretaries of State for Commonwealth Affairs
Chancellors of the Duchy of Lancaster
Deputy Lieutenants in Scotland
European Commissioners 1973–1977
Fellows of the Royal Society of Edinburgh
Infectious disease deaths in England
Knights of the Thistle
Labour Party (UK) life peers
Thomson of Monifieth, George Thomson, Baron
Members of the Fabian Society
Members of the Parliament of the United Kingdom for Dundee constituencies
Members of the Privy Council of the United Kingdom
Ministers in the Wilson governments, 1964–1970
People educated at Grove Academy
Politicians from Dundee
Royal Air Force personnel of World War II
Scottish Labour MPs
20th-century Scottish businesspeople
Scottish journalists
Scottish newspaper editors
Social Democratic Party (UK) life peers
The Dandy people
UK MPs 1951–1955
UK MPs 1955–1959
UK MPs 1959–1964
UK MPs 1964–1966
UK MPs 1966–1970
UK MPs 1970–1974
UK MPs who were granted peerages
People from Charing
Life peers created by Elizabeth II